Mateus Manuel Agostinho (born 28 July 1974), commonly known as Bodunha, is an Angolan retired footballer who played as a right back.

Club career
Born in Luanda, Portuguese Angola, Bodunha started and ended his 13-year professional career at Atlético Petróleos de Luanda. In January 1999 he moved to Portugal, where he would remain seven seasons.

In the latter country's Primeira Liga, Bodunha appeared in 65 games, scoring a combined two goals for S.C. Salgueiros and S.C. Braga. He retired in 2006, at the age of 32.

International career
Bodunha earned 40 caps for Angola, during slightly more than 11 years. He was part of the squad that appeared in the 1998 Africa Cup of Nations, playing in the 0–0 draw against South Africa as the tournament ended in group stage exit.

International goals
Scores and results list Angola's goal tally first.

References

External links

1974 births
Living people
Footballers from Luanda
Angolan footballers
Association football defenders
Girabola players
Atlético Petróleos de Luanda players
Primeira Liga players
Liga Portugal 2 players
S.C. Espinho players
S.C. Salgueiros players
S.C. Braga players
F.C. Maia players
Gondomar S.C. players
Angola international footballers
1998 African Cup of Nations players
Angolan expatriate footballers
Expatriate footballers in Portugal
Expatriate footballers in Spain
Angolan expatriate sportspeople in Portugal